Alamgir Karim, from the National Institute of Standards and Technology, was awarded the status of Fellow in the American Physical Society, after they were nominated by their Division of Polymer Physics in 2004, for pioneering research on polymer thin films and interfaces, polymer brushes, blend film phase separation, thin film dewetting, pattern formation in block copolymer films, and the application of combinatoric measurement methods to complex polymer physics.

Karim is the Dow Chair and Welch Foundation Professor, the director of the International Polymer & Soft Matter Center (IPSMC), and the director of the Materials Engineering Program in the William A. Brookshire Department of Chemical and Biomolecular Engineering of the Cullen College of Engineering at the University of Houston.

References 

Fellows of the American Physical Society
American physicists
Living people
Date of death missing
Year of birth missing (living people)